Her Highness is the third album by American rock band Medicine, released in 1995 by American Recordings. The band broke up after the album's release, and would not record again until 2003's The Mechanical Forces of Love.

Critical reception
The Encyclopedia of Popular Music called the album "almost numbingly introspective, both musically and lyrically." The Chicago Tribune wrote that "for all of its manufactured navel-contemplating, Her Highness is a trance-inducing album due mostly to its languor." The Tampa Bay Times wrote that a "new-found versatility actually opens the heavy-handed Medicine to lighter, ethereal passages ... rather than just feedback-laden noisefests—although the swirling psychedelic jam of 'Heads' may be one of the group's finest efforts."

Track listing

Personnel 
Medicine
Jim Goodall – drums
Brad Laner – vocals, guitar, bass guitar, keyboards, arrangement, production, engineering
Beth Thompson – vocals, photography
Production and additional personnel
David Campbell – violin, viola, arrangement
Larry Corbett – cello
David Harlan – design
Bruce Lampcov – mixing
Medicine – art direction
Justin Meldal-Johnsen – bass guitar, clarinet
Eddy Offord – production, engineering
Tom Recchion – art direction

References

External links 
 

1995 albums
American Recordings (record label) albums
Medicine (band) albums